Fufuao or Rampur Phuphuaon is a village in Dildarnagar Kamsar in the Indian state of Uttar Pradesh.

History
The village was established by Zamindar Firoz Khan in 1640 , who was a grandson of Sarkar diwan Raja Quttul khan zamindar jagirdar taluka sawerai and great-grandson of Narhar Khan founder of Dildarnagar Kamsar. The village is also known as Rampur because when Firoz Khan build his house many hindu families came and build there houses and named three colony as Rampur after a cupple of centuries population increased and both the village Fufuaon and Rampur started looking same and Rampur was made a part of Fufuaon village.

Demographics
As of 2011 Indian Census, Fufuao had a total population of 3,095, of which 1,574 were males and 1,521 were females. Population within the age group of 0 to 6 years was 507. The total number of literates in Fufuao was 1,998, which constituted 64.6% of the population with male literacy of 72.6% and female literacy of 56.3%. The effective literacy rate of 7+ population of Fufuao was 77.2%, of which male literacy rate was 87.9% and female literacy rate was 66.4%. The Scheduled Castes and Scheduled Tribes population was 797 and 6 respectively. Fufuao had 452 households in 2011. The main population of the village lived in an area of more than 60 acres.

References 

Villages in Ghazipur district
Dildarnagar
Dildarnagar Fatehpur
Cities and towns in Ghazipur district
Towns and villages in Kamsar